Robert Sherard was a writer.

Robert Sherard may also refer to:

Robert Sherard (MP) for Leicestershire (UK Parliament constituency)
Robert Sherard, 4th Earl of Harborough (1719–1799)
 Robert Sherard, 6th Earl of Harborough (1797–1859)
 Robert Castell Sherard, 12th Baron Sherard (1858–1931)